Downtown New Iberia Commercial Historic District is a historic district in downtown New Iberia, Louisiana, located along Main Street and St. Peter Street, from Jefferson Street to Weeks Street.

The  area comprises a total of 121 buildings, of which 73 are considered contributing properties, and 9 are also listed on the National Register of Historic Places as individual properties or as part of East Main Street Historic District. Building dates vary from 1870 to 1967 and represent relevant structures related to commerce and entertainment/recreation.

Despite being located inside the district area, the individually listed The Magnolias is not part of Downtown New Iberia Commercial Historic District, as the building is not commerce related. The house is therefore considered a non-contributing property.

The historic district was listed on the National Register of Historic Places on December 13, 2017.

Contributing properties
The historical district contains a total of 73 contributing properties, built between 1870 and 1967:

NEW IBERIA (steamboat) shipwreck, .  Also individually listed.

Main Street

Weeks Street and Julia Street

St. Peter Street and Jefferson Street

Iberia Street, Burke Street and Bridge Street

Church Alley

See also
National Register of Historic Places listings in Iberia Parish, Louisiana
East Main Street Historic District
Pascal Building
Evangeline Theater
John R. Taylor Drugstore
People's National Bank
Wormser's Department Store
First United Methodist Church
NEW IBERIA (steamboat) shipwreck

References

Historic districts on the National Register of Historic Places in Louisiana
National Register of Historic Places in Iberia Parish, Louisiana